The Washington Palace Five (also known as the Laundrymen) were an American basketball team based in Washington, D.C. that was a member of the American Basketball League. The team was owned by George Preston Marshall, who later brought the Washington Commanders football team to D.C. The team was sponsored by Palace Laundry, a chain of laundries—thus, the team's nickname.

The team played at the Arcade, a large amusement center located at the corner of 14th and Irving Streets NW, where the DC USA shopping center is currently located. Along with the basketball team, the facility hosted a 4,000 seat arena, skating, movie screens, bowling, and more.

During the 1927–28 season, they dropped out of the league on January 2, 1928 and were replaced by the Brooklyn Visitations.

Year-by-year

References

Basketball teams in Washington, D.C.
1925 establishments in Washington, D.C.
1928 disestablishments in Washington, D.C.
Basketball teams established in 1925
Basketball teams disestablished in 1928